The China men's national under-18 ice hockey team is the men's national under-18 ice hockey team of China. The team is controlled by the Chinese Ice Hockey Association, a member of the International Ice Hockey Federation. The team represents China at the IIHF World U18 Championships. At the IIHF Asian Oceanic U18 Championships, the team won two gold, six silver, and six bronze medals.

International competitions

IIHF Asian Oceanic U18 Championships

1984:  2nd place
1985: Did not participate
1986:  2nd place
1987:  2nd place
1988:  1st place
1989:  3rd place
1990:  2nd place
1991:  2nd place
1992:  3rd place

1993: 4th place
1994: 4th place
1995:  3rd place
1996: 4th place
1997: 4th place
1998:  3rd place
1999:  3rd place
2000:  3rd place
2001:  2nd place
2002:  1st place

IIHF World U18 Championships

 
2003: 3rd in Division III Group A
2004-2006 Did not participate
2007: 2nd in Division III
2008: 5th in Division II Group B
2009: 6th in Division II Group B
2010: 1st in Division III Group A

2011: 5th in Division II Group B
2012: 6th in Division II Group B
2013: 1st in Division III Group A
2014: 5th in Division II Group B
2015: 5th in Division II Group B
2016: 6th in Division II Group B
2017: 1st in Division III Group A

External links
China at IIHF.com

Ice hockey in China
National under-18 ice hockey teams
Ice hockey